Prithvi Chand is an Indian politician and member of the Bharatiya Janata Party. Chand was a member of the Jammu and Kashmir Legislative Assembly from the Ramnagar constituency in Udhampur District.

References 

People from Udhampur district
Janata Party politicians
Bharatiya Janata Party politicians from Jammu and Kashmir
Jammu and Kashmir MLAs 1977–1983
Living people
21st-century Indian politicians
Year of birth missing (living people)
Jammu and Kashmir MLAs 1996–2002